Fernando Alves dos Santos (born 23 March 1979 in Rio de Janeiro, Brazil), sometimes known as just Fernando, is a  football defender. He is currently signed for Estrela do Norte which will contest the Campeonato Capixaba next year. Born in Brazil, he represented the Equatorial Guinea national team.

Club career
Fernando played for Tombense (2003), Estrela do Norte (2004–05), Social (2006) when the team won the access to the Campeonato Mineiro's First Division, and for Tupi in the winning seasons of the club on 2007 and 2008. He then played for Democrata and Juazeirense.

International career
Fernando was one of the Brazilian-born naturalised Equatoguinean players by the Brazilian Antônio Dumas (Equatorial Guinea's former coach).

Through of his naturalisation, he has been international for the Equatoguinean national team on 25 March 2007 in an Africa Cup of Nations 2008 Qualifying match against Rwanda, in Malabo, that his national team won 3–1.
Also he was called for other Africa Cup of Nations 2008 Qualifying match, against Rwanda in Kigali on 2 June 2007.

Honours

Club
Tupi
Taça Minas Gerais: 2008

References

External links
Fernando CBF Database 

1979 births
Living people
Footballers from Rio de Janeiro (city)
Brazilian footballers
Equatoguinean footballers
Equatorial Guinea international footballers
Naturalized citizens of Equatorial Guinea
Equatoguinean expatriate footballers
Tombense Futebol Clube players
Estrela do Norte Futebol Clube players
Americano Futebol Clube players
Tupi Football Club players
Esporte Clube Democrata players
Villa Nova Atlético Clube players
Maranhão Atlético Clube players
Uberlândia Esporte Clube players
Oeste Futebol Clube players
Association football central defenders